The 2001–02 Turkish Basketball League was the 36th season of the top-tier professional basketball league in Turkey. The season started on October 13, 2011. Efes Pilsen won their ninth national championship this season.

Regular season

League table

Beko Basketball League 2001–02 play-offs

as of June 30, 2002

The 2002 Beko Basketball League play-offs is the final phase of the 2001–2002 regular season.

First round, Quarterfinal and Semifinal series are 5-match series. The teams reaches the first 3 wins is through to the next round.  The team which has won both regular season matchups starts with a 1–0 lead to the series. If teams split up the regular season meetings, series starts with a 1–1 draw.

Final series are 7-match series and the team reaches first 4 wins is the champion of the Beko Basketball League.

External links
 Turkish Basketball League Official Website
 Turkish Basketball Federation Official Website
 TBLStat.net 

Turkish Basketball Super League seasons
Turkish
1